, also known in English as Priest of Darkness, is a 1936 Japanese jidaigeki film directed by Sadao Yamanaka.  It is one of three surviving films by the director.

Cast
 Chojuro Kawarasaki – Kōchiyama Sōshun
 Kanemon Nakamura – Kaneko
 Shizue Yamagishi – Oshizu
 Setsuko Hara – Onami
 Daisuke Katō (credited as Enji Ichikawa) – Kenta

Production
The original idea for Kōchiyama Sōshun came from a Kabuki play by Kawatake Mokuami, known as Kochiyama to naozamurai. In the play, the two title characters are petty criminals from the Ueno district of Edo (now Tokyo). Yamanaka changed some of the characters from the play to be more good-natured, in keeping with his film aesthetic. He also modernized the Kabuki play by casting actors from the Zenshin-za Group, which aimed to bring modern acting techniques to traditional Kabuki plays.

References

External links
 

Japanese black-and-white films
1936 films
Films directed by Sadao Yamanaka
Nikkatsu films
Japanese drama films
1936 drama films
Films set in Edo
1930s Japanese-language films